The 1894 South Carolina Gamecocks football team represented South Carolina College—now known as the University of South Carolina–as an independent during the 1894 college football season. South Carolina compiled a record of 0–2. Home games were played on the athletic field at the State Fairgrounds on Elmwood Avenue in Columbia, South Carolina.

Schedule

References

South Carolina
South Carolina Gamecocks football seasons
South Carolina Gamecocks football